Mandesha (born 2003) is a French Thoroughbred racehorse. In 2006 she won three Group One races and was named European Champion Three-Year-Old Filly.

External links
pedigreequery.com
racingpost.co.uk

2003 racehorse births
Thoroughbred family 9-c
Racehorses bred in France
Racehorses trained in France
Cartier Award winners